Robert Joel McLane (August 4, 1944 in Macon, Georgia – September 30, 1992 in Riverside, California) was an American actor who is known for having starred in the early openly gay film A Very Natural Thing in 1974.

Early life
He was born Robert Joel McLane, and was sometimes credited under the name Robert McLane. He was born in 1944 in Macon, Georgia. and grew up on a farm in Wagener, South Carolina. He graduated from Furman University in 1965.

Acting career
Joel had various roles in theater. He was debuted on Broadway in 1969 as “He Who Hears Thunder” in Arthur Kopit's
Indians on Broadway in 1969. A year later, he had a leading
role in the NET Playhouse television drama They Have Taken Over that was an adaptation of the novel by Marya Mannes.
He had a minor role in Alan Arkin’s Little Murders of 1971.

He starred in Blue Summer (1973) with Bo White and again with White in A Very Natural Thing (1974) under the name Robert Joel. Joel played the lead, David, a gay ex-monk, who finds love in New York City. The film has been viewed as being the first film to show gay love. His other co-stars were Curt Gareth, Jay Pierce, and Vito Russo, who went on to write The Celluloid Closet. Joel also appeared in Russ Meyer's Up! (1976), Little Murders (1971), Barbara (1970), Arthur Kopit's Indians on Broadway, and a 1971 PBS television drama, They.

Playwright
He wrote one-act plays, one of which, Triptych, was presented in 1990 at the Glenn Wallichs Theater at the University of the Redlands, and was directed by Kent Paul.

Later life and death
He moved to Riverside where he wrote plays and taught. He worked for the AIDS Project, coordinating the work of volunteer therapists who worked with persons with AIDS and their families.  He died in 1992 of AIDS. A panel honoring him appears on the AIDS memorial quilt.

External links

References

1944 births
1992 deaths
People from Macon, Georgia
Actors from South Carolina
AIDS-related deaths in California
Furman University alumni